= In the Shadow of Saddam =

Novel by Mikhael Ramadan

- Author: Mikhael Ramadan
- Language: English
- Publication date: 1999

In the Shadow of Saddam is the first novel by Mikhael Ramadan. It is a collection of memories. Ramadan, who claims to be an Iraqi defector and former Saddam Hussein body double, asserts that in 1997, Hussein ordered development of "a highly virulent strain of West Nile virus as bioterrorist weapon" capable of killing 97 percent of the population in an urban environment.
